Project Magnet may refer to:
Project Magnet (UFO), a Canadian unidentified flying object (UFO) study  
Project Magnet (USN), a U.S. Navy geomagnetic survey project using aircraft and ships 1951–1994